Giritli Ali Aziz Efendi (1749, in Kandiye (Heraklion) – 29 October 1798, in Berlin) was an Ottoman ambassador and an Ottoman author of the late-18th century and he is notable for his novel "Muhayyelât" (Imaginations), a unique work of fiction blending personal and fantastic themes, well in the current of the traditional Ottoman prose, but also exhibiting influences from Western literature.

Biography
He was born in Kandiye (Crete) as the son of Tahmisçi Mehmed Efendi, who was the defterdar of the Crete Eyalet, in 1749. The details on his life are rather sparse and scattered. He rose through the Ottoman hierarchy and was sent as ambassador to Prussia in 1796 and he died in Berlin in 1798. His burial marked also the opening of the first Turkish or Muslim cemetery in Berlin.

Muhayyelât
Consisting in three parts and written in a laconical style contrasting with its content, where djinns and fairies surge from within contexts drawn from ordinary real life situations, Ali Aziz Efendi often pursues by pulling the reader towards description of magic and to extraordinary occurrences. Inspired by a much older story written both in Arabic and Assyrian, the author also displays in his work his deep knowledge of sufism, hurufism and Bektashi traditions. Muhayyelât is considered to be an early precursor of the new Turkish literature to emerge in the Tanzimat period of the 19th century. It also influenced Tanzimat literature directly when the manuscript was printed in 1867 and became a very popular book of the time. His work is re-discovered by Turkey's reading public rather recently and is increasingly admitted as a classic.

Ali Aziz Efendi also wrote further and shorter works of prose, which present as complementary extensions to Muhayyelât, as well as some poetry, and kept a correspondence with a number of notable figures of his time, both Ottoman and Western.

He is also cited for a short sefâretnâme he wrote relating his introduction to his mission as the ambassador of the Ottoman Empire in Prussia.

Works
 Muhayyelât (Imaginations), 312p.,

See also
 Ahmed Resmî Efendi
 Sefâretnâme
 Cretan Turks

Sources

References

 'Aziz efendis Muhayyelat, by Andreas Tietze, Oriens, 1948. (in German)
 The five works of the beginnings of the Turkish novel: "Muhayyelat" of Aziz Efendi (1796), "Akabi" of Vartan Pasha (Hovsep Vartanian) (1851), "Hayalat-ı Dil" of Hasan Tevfik (1868), "Temaşa" of Evangelinos Misailidis (1872), "Müsameretname" of Emin Nihat Bey (1875) by Dr. Gonca Gökalp, Hacettepe University (in Turkish, the abstract also in English)

1749 births
1798 deaths
Writers from Heraklion
Cretan Turks
Ambassadors of the Ottoman Empire to Prussia
18th-century writers from the Ottoman Empire
18th-century diplomats